Floréal is the lead ship of the s of the French Navy. Floréal is the first French vessel named after the eighth month of the Republican Calendar. The ship was constructed by Chantiers de l'Atlantique at Saint-Nazaire, France, in 1992 and entered service in 1993. Floréal is stationed at Réunion in the Indian Ocean for patrol duties.

Design and description
The s were designed in response to a demand for a cheap warship capable of operating in low threat areas and able to perform general patrol functions. As a result, the Floréal class were constructed to mercantile standards in the areas of ammunition stowage, helicopter facilities and damage control, which significantly lowered the cost of the vessels. The Floréal class were designed for using modular construction which shortened their building times.

Due to the frigate's broad beam, the ship is equipped with fin stabilisers.

The frigate is powered by a combined diesel and diesel (CODAD) system comprising four SEMT Pielstick 6 PA6 L280 BPC diesel engines driving two shafts each turning a LIPS controllable pitch propeller. The CODAD system is rated at  The vessel is also equipped with one  bow thruster. Due to the mercantile construction design, the four diesels are all located within one machinery room for ease of maintenance. Both diesel fuel and TR5 aviation fuel is brought aboard at a single location at the stern compared to naval-constructed vessels which sport two. The ship also has three  diesel-electric generators located just fore and aft of the machinery room.

Floréal was armed with two Exocet MM38 surface-to-surface missiles in launchers situated centrally atop the midships superstructure. However, at the end of the missile's life cycle in 2014, the launchers were removed as the French Navy did not intend to replace the capability aboard the ships. The ship also mounts one 100 mm CADAM turret with the Najir fire control system located forwards and two 20 mm modèle F2 guns situated in atop the aft superstructure. The ship is equipped with DRBV-21C (Mars) air sentry, Racal Decca RM1290 navigation and Racal Decca RM1290 landing radars along with ARBG-1A Saïgon communications intercept, CSF ARBR 16A radar intercept electronic surveillance systems and two Dagaie decoy systems. 

The frigate is equipped with a  helicopter landing pad located on the stern and a  hangar. The ship is capable of operating the embarked Eurocopter AS565 Panther up to sea state 5. Floréal is capable of operating helicopters up to the size of the Eurocopter AS332 Super Puma. Based out of Réunion, she most commonly operates the AS565 Panther. The ship has a complement of 90 including the aircrew and officers and 24 marines with capacity for a further 13 personnel.

Construction and career 
Floréal was ordered as part of the first pair on 20 January 1989 from Chantiers de l'Atlantique for construction at their yard in Saint-Nazaire, France, and the keel was laid down on 2 April 1990. The frigate was built using modular construction methods, which reduced the vessel's construction time. Floréal was launched on 6 October 1990 and commissioned into the French Navy on 27 May 1992. Following sea trials, Floréal sailed for Arsenal de Lorient, Lorient where the weapons and sensors were installed and underwent further trials.

After entering service, Floréal was assigned to the French Pacific territories, based at Réunion, monitoring of the exclusive economic zone in the French Southern and Antarctic Lands. In October 1995, one week after Bob Denard overthrew the government of the Comoros in late September, French commandos using the frigate as a base of operations, landed in the island and arrested Denard. In 2002, Floréals helicopter drove off pirates that were attacking the Lebanese vessel Princess Sarah off Somalia.  In 2003, Floréal underwent a major overhaul at Papeete, Tahiti.

On 17 March 2009, Floréal contacted the private yacht Tanit, which was sailing for Kenya, about entering the Gulf of Aden and the dangers of piracy. The owners of the yacht, Florent and Chloë Lemaçon, decided to continue on their journey. The frigate escorted the yacht until 20 March, when the frigate was not allowed to go any farther. On 4 April, Tanit was seized by pirates off the coast of Ras Hafun, Somalia and those aboard taken hostage. Floréal took part in the action that led to the release of Tanit during which one of the hostages and two of the pirates were killed. On 5 December 2014, the frigate searched three vessels illegally fishing near Juan de Nova Island. Shark fins without carcasses were found and as a result  of fishery products were destroyed.

On 10 October 2017, while at the port of Durban, South Africa, Floréal was struck by a container ship that had broken its hawsers during a storm and drifted into the frigate. The frigate was seriously damaged. The ship was repaired at Mauritius.

In 2018, the frigate was assigned to Combined Task Force 150 (CTF 150), intercepting drug smuggling in the Indian Ocean. Floréal seized  of cannabis after searching two dhows off Oman. In 2019, the vessel joined CTF 150 again and intercepted  of cannabis. On 28 May 2019, the frigate moved to inspect an un-flagged dhow in the Indian Ocean. During the inspection,  of heroin was found and seized.

Citations

References
 
 
 
 

Floréal-class frigates
Frigates of France
1990 ships
Ships built in France